Michael or Mike Russell may refer to:

Churchmen
 Michael Russell (bishop of Glasgow and Galloway) (1806–1848), Episcopalian Bishop of Glasgow and Galloway
 Michael Russell (bishop of Waterford and Lismore) (1920–2009), Roman Catholic Bishop of Waterford and Lismore, Ireland

Musicians
 Mike "Razz" Russell, multi-instrumentalist and member of the Original Harmony Ridge Creekdippers
 Micho Russell (1915–1994), Irish traditional musician (tin whistle player)

Politicians
 Michael Russell (Scottish politician) (born 1953), Cabinet Secretary for Government Business and Constitutional Relations in the Scottish Government
 Michael Russell (Rensselaer County, New York) (1844–1901), New York politician

Sportsmen
 Michael Russell (sailor) (born 1949), Bahamian Olympic sailor
 Michael Russell (tennis) (born 1978), American tennis player
 Mike Russell (billiards player) (born 1969), English billiards player
 Mike Frank Russell (born 1977), Irish Gaelic footballer

Others
 Michael Russell (scientist), British geologist 
 Mike Russell (author), American writer and cartoonist
 Mike Russell, founder of American City Business Journals